The Representation of the European Commission in Germany is a representation of the European Commission with the head office located in Berlin. There are two more regional representation offices in Bonn and Munich. Jörg Wojahn is in charge of the representations in Germany since 1 September  2019,.

History  
The representation of the European Commission started as a press liaison office of the European Coal and Steel Community in 1951 in Bonn. It was the first press liaison office followed by offices in Rome and Paris. The main task of the press liaison office was to maintain and strengthen contact to the press and other national sources of information. After the establishment of the European Economic Community and the European Atomic Energy Community in 1957, the office became responsible for representing their interests as well. In 1989 the range of tasks was further extended and was renamed into Representation of the European Commission. Due to the Decision on the Capital of Germany the head office of the representation was moved from Bonn to Berlin.

Function 
The representation serves as a link between the national government, the public and the European Commission in Brussels. It informs the public and the media about the policies of the Commission and maintains contact to the federal and national parliaments. At the same time, it informs the office in Brussels about the political situation in Germany and informs about the demands from Germany.

Headquarter of the Representation in Berlin

Tasks 
The head office of the representation is located in Haus der Europäischen Union in Berlin, where the information office of the European Parliament and Erlebnis Europa are located. The representation office in Berlin maintains contact to the German Bundestag, Bundesrat of Germany and Cabinet of Germany, operating actively in press work and communicates with the public. It is regionally responsible for ten federal states: Berlin, Brandenburg, Bremen, Hamburg, Mecklenburg-Western Pomerania, Lower Saxony, Saxony, Saxony-Anhalt, Schleswig-Holstein, Thuringia.

Head of the Representation 
Jörg Wojahn is the Head of the Representation in Germany since 1 September 2019. Prior to this engagement, he was the Head of Representation in Austria.

Predecessors were: 
 Richard Kühnel (June 2014 - August 2019)
 Marie-Thérèse Duffy-Häusler (Oktober 2013 – June 2014)
Matthias Petschke (2009–2013), today director for european satellite navigation programme in the General-Directorate of the European Commission for Industry and Entrepreneurship
 Gerhard Sabathil (2004–2008), today director of European External Action Service
 Axel R. Bunz (1993–2003)
 Gerd Langguth (1988–1993)

Political Department 
The political department is responsible for the communication between the Commission and the political decision-makers in Germany. In addition, it compiles reports and analysis about the political, economical and social trends, as well as, special events in Germany. 
Vice versa, it disseminates the European policy by presentations and events for the public and experts. Head of the department is Nora Hesse.

Department for Communication 

The department for communication informs the citizens about what is happening and why on the European level. For that it cooperates closely with partners from the civil society, federal and regional government. Head of the department is Dina Behnke.

Press Department 

The press department informs journalists in Germany about the policies of the Commission, answers questions and issues statements. Tools are a daily Email newsletter with important messages for Germany from the Commission, a weekly schedule preview and a two-weekly brochure. 

Head of the department is Birgit Schmeitzner.

Regional Representation in Bonn 

The regional representation of the European Commission in Bonn is located in the former headquarter of the representation of the Commission, which moved to Berlin in 1999. It serves as a link between the Commission in Brussel and the four federal states North Rhine-Westphalia, Hessen, Rhineland Palatinate and Saarland. Patrick Lobis is in charge of the office.

Information service 

The information service answers questions about all Europe related topics and supplies information material. In addition, it has a lot of information about the Regional policy of the European Union.

Events 

The regional representation organises many events on its own or with co-operation partners in North Rhine-Westphalia, Hessen, Rhineland Palatinate and Saarland.

Regional Representation in Munich 

The regional representation in Munich covers the federal states of Bavaria and Baden-Wuerttemberg. The acting head of the office is Renke Deckarm.

Citizen service 

The department for citizen service provides interested citizen, journalists and school with information and materials.

Events 

The regional representation office organises many events in Baden-Wuerttemberg and Bavaria.

Regional information and advise services

EUROPE DIRECT 

In Germany there are 50 europe direct information centres as local link between the citizen and the European Union. The information centres are co-financed from the Budget of the European Union and has the purpose to help, inform and answers questions from the local public about the European Union. The representation office in Munich co-ordinate their work and supply materials and training for the staff.

Enterprise Europe Network 

The Enterprise Europe Network (EEN) is part of the europe direct network of the European Commission. The EEN supports the co-operation, transfer of technology and building as well as maintaining strategic partnership between Small and medium-sized enterprises.

European Documentation Centre 

The 51 European Documentation Centres in Germany promotes teaching and research of questions about the European integration. They are located close to higher education institutions and research facilities and ensure that documents and publications are available for teaching and research.

Team Europe 

Team Europe is a team consisting of 52 experts from every part of Germany who can be booked for presentations about different European topics.

References 

European Commission
Germany and the European Union
Buildings and structures of the European Union
Buildings and structures in Berlin